is a passenger railway station located in the city of Tamba, Hyōgo Prefecture, Japan, operated by West Japan Railway Company (JR West).

Lines

Station layout
The station consists of one ground-level side platform serving a singe bi-directional track. There is no station building, but only a concrete shelter. The station is unattended.

History
Kugemura Station opened on 27 December 1924. With the privatization of the Japan National Railways (JNR) on 1 April 1987, the station came under the aegis of the West Japan Railway Company.

Passenger statistics
In fiscal 2016, the station was used by an average of 6 passengers daily

Surrounding area
Tamba City Hall Sannan Branch (Sannan Resident Center)
Tamba Ryu Fossil Studio "Chitan no Yakata"a

See also
List of railway stations in Japan

References

External links

 Station Official Site

Railway stations in Hyōgo Prefecture
Railway stations in Japan opened in 1924
Tamba, Hyōgo